Barra del Colorado Wildlife Refuge is a wildlife refuge, part of the Tortuguero Conservation Area, in Limón Province in the northeastern part of Costa Rica. It is the second largest rain forest preserve in the country and protects areas that contain hot humid forests, mangroves, canals and marine areas. The Refuge is bounded in part by the San Juan and Colorado rivers, and is located to the south the Tortuguero National Park.

The area protected has a hot and humid climate with no dry season, and is the habitat of the endangered West Indian manatee as well as many caymans, crocodiles, and fish. It is also home to a variety of tapirs, jaguars, cougars, monkeys, ocelots, and other mammals. Birds found include osprey, toucans, cormorants, herons, hawks, and many more.

The village of Tortuguero, from which the neighbouring Tortuguero National Park received its name, is located on the southern border the refuge, and contains two research stations.

External links 
 Barra del Colorado Wildlife Refuge, Área de Conservación Tortuguero
 Barra del Colorado Wildlife Refuge at Costa Rica National Parks

Nature reserves in Costa Rica
Geography of Limón Province